The Alaskan Engineering Commission (AEC) was a U.S. Federal agency, sometimes known by its initials or by alternate spelling Alaska Engineering Commission.  It was created by the Alaska Railroad Act in 1914 by U.S. President Woodrow Wilson in order to arrange for the construction of a railway system in Alaska.  William C. Edes was named chairman, chief engineer Colonel Frederick Mears. In 1915, the AEC became part of the U.S. Department of the Interior.  In 1923, after the railroad began operation and construction was complete, it became the Alaska Railroad Commission, later renamed to The Alaska Railroad.

Among other accomplishments, it designed and/or built a number of works listed on the U.S. National Register of Historic Places.

Works include:
Mears Memorial Bridge, built in 1923
Alaska Engineering Commission Cottage No. 23, 618 Christensen Dr. Anchorage, Alaska, NRHP-listed
Alaska Engineering Commission Cottage No. 25, 645 W. Third Ave., Anchorage, AK, NRHP-listed 
Pioneer School House, 3rd Ave. and Eagle St., Anchorage, AK, NRHP-listed
Seward Depot, 501 Railway Ave. Seward, Alaska, NRHP-listed
Wasilla Depot, Parks Highway and Knik Rd. Wasilla, Alaska, NRHP-listed
Whitney Section House, 3400 W. Neuser Dr., Wasilla, AK, NRHP-listed

References

External links
Alaska Engineering Commission Photograph Collection - University of Washington Digital Collection

Agencies of the United States government
Alaska Railroad